The Journal of Consumer Behaviour is a bimonthly peer-reviewed academic journal dedicated to the study of consumer behaviour. It was established in 2001 and is published by John Wiley & Sons. The editors-in-chief are Steven D'Alessandro (University of Tasmania) and Jacqueline Eastman (Georgia Southern University). According to the Journal Citation Reports, the journal has a 2020 impact factor of 3.28, ranking it 100 out of 153 journals in the category "Business".

Reference

External links

Business and management journals
Publications established in 2001
Bimonthly journals
Wiley (publisher) academic journals
English-language journals
Consumer behaviour